Prince Charles Hospital is a district general hospital in Gurnos, Merthyr Tydfil, Wales. It is managed by the Cwm Taf Morgannwg University Health Board.

History
Construction of the first phase of the new hospital began in 1972 and it was officially opened in 1978. Services were transferred from Merthyr General Hospital in 1986, and once a second phase of the Prince Charles Hospital had been completed in 1991, services also transferred from Buckland Hospital.

A new Emergency Care Centre opened in 2012 and the complete refurbishment of the whole hospital was approved by the Welsh Government in October 2013.

As part of a £6m revamp, a new state-of-the-art maternity unit was unveiled at the hospital in 2019.

A hospital helipad was installed in 2017 at the cost of £700,000 and intended to be used for emergency night-time takeoffs and landings by rescue helicopters. In 2019 it had yet to be used because of a lack of adequate fencing and lights, which has raised safety concerns.

The hospital's maternity services were put into special measures in 2019 after concerns were raised about the treatment of mothers and their babies. There were also concerns about the standard of care affording to a cancer patient who died in the hospital.

References

External links 
 
 Prince Charles Hospital on the NHS Direct Wales website
 Healthcare Inspectorate Wales inspection reports

Hospital buildings completed in 1978
NHS hospitals in Wales
Hospitals in Merthyr Tydfil County Borough
Hospitals established in 1978
1978 establishments in the United Kingdom
Cwm Taf Morgannwg University Health Board